The Principality of Anhalt was a State of the Holy Roman Empire, located in Central Germany, in what is today part of the federal state of Saxony-Anhalt.

Under the rule of the House of Ascania, the Anhalt territory was split off the German stem duchy of Saxony in 1212 and granted to Count Henry I, who was raised to the rank of a Prince of the Holy Roman Empire in 1218. Ruled by Ascanian princes from the High Middle Ages to the Early modern period, Anhalt was divided several times amongst various lines of the dynasty until the dissolution of the Empire in 1806, when Napoleon elevated the remaining states of Anhalt-Bernburg, Anhalt-Dessau and Anhalt-Köthen to duchies.

Geography 

The Anhalt territory stretched from the Harz mountain range in the west to the Elbe River and beyond to the Fläming Heath in the east. Upon the 1315 loss of Anhalt-Aschersleben, the lands around Ballenstedt formed a western exclave. The area of the later duchy was 906 sq mi (2,300 km2).

In the west, the land is undulating and in the extreme northwest, where it forms part of the Harz mountains, hilly, with the Ramberg (Harz) peak as the tallest point at 1,900 ft (579 m). From the Harz the country gently shelves down to the Saale; the land between this river and the Elbe is particularly fertile. East of the Elbe, the land is mostly a flat sandy plain, with extensive pine forests, interspersed with bog-land and rich pastures. The Elbe is the chief river, intersecting the eastern portion of the former duchy, from east to west, and at Rosslau is met by the Mulde.  The navigable Saale takes a northerly direction through the central portion of the territory and receives, on the right, the Fuhne and, on the left, the Wipper and the Bode.

The climate is generally mild, less so in the higher Harz regions to the south-west.

History 
From the 9th century onward, the western parts of the later Anhalt territory up to the Elbe and Saale rivers were included in the Schwabengau region of Eastphalia, the eastern part of the medieval Duchy of Saxony. In the 11th century, it came under the rule of Count Esico of Ballenstedt (died 1059 or 1060), mentioned in a 1036 deed issued by Emperor Conrad II at Tilleda. Possibly a descendant of the Saxon margrave Odo, he owned large allodial lands around Ballenstedt in the Schwabengau as well as in the adjacent Gau Serimunt in the former Saxon Eastern March. 

Count Esico was succeeded by his son Adalbert II of Ballenstedt, who also appeared as a count in the Saxon Nordthüringgau and further territories in the Eastern March. Adalbert joined the Saxon Rebellion against King Henry IV and was slain in a feud with Egeno II of Konradsburg in 1180. His son Count Otto the Rich appeared as a "Count of Ballenstedt" from 1106. When Emperor Henry V temporarily deprived Lothair of Supplinburg of the Saxon ducal title in 1112, Otto was enfeoffed with the Duchy of Saxony, which, however, he had to renounce shortly afterwards, as Lothair and Henry had reconciled. On the eve of the 1115 Battle of Welfesholz, Otto campaigned the lands of the Polabian Slavs, gaining large estates around Zerbst up to the Hevelli lands ruled by the Hevelli princes.

County of Anhalt
Until his death in 1123, Count Otto had Anhalt Castle built in the Harz mountains near Harzgerode and appears to have been among the first to assume the title of a "Count of Anhalt". He was the father of Albert the Bear, who temporarily was appointed Margrave of the Saxon Eastern March (or March of Lusatia) by the Saxon duke Lothair of Supplinburg and struggled for the ducal title himself. Albert could not prevail against the Welf duke Henry the Lion, nevertheless he conquered the eastern territories of the former Northern March, which had been lost in the 983 Great Slav Rising, where he established the Margraviate of Brandenburg in 1157. When he died in 1170, his younger son Count Bernhard inherited the Ascanian home territories around Anhalt Castle and after the deposition of Henry the Lion by Emperor Frederick Barbarossa finally became Duke of Saxony in 1180. However, he effectively only ruled over the Eastphalian territories, while the Westphalian and Engern parts of Saxony fell under the control of the Prince-Archbishops of Cologne.

The County of Anhalt finally arose upon the death of Duke Bernhard in 1212, when his sons divided their heritage. The younger Albert I became Duke of Saxony, while the elder Henry I went on to rule the Ascanian lands, now definitely separated from Saxony, as Count of Anhalt. In 1218, Henry I assumed the title of a prince and thereby was the real founder of the princely House of Anhalt.

Princes of Anhalt 

On Henry's death in 1252, his three sons partitioned the principality and founded, respectively, the lines of Aschersleben, Bernburg and Zerbst.  The family ruling in Aschersleben became extinct in 1315, and this district was subsequently incorporated in the neighboring Bishopric of Halberstadt, thus dividing the territory of Anhalt-Bernburg in two separate pieces.  The last prince of the original line of Anhalt-Bernburg died in 1468 and his lands were inherited by the princes of the sole remaining line, that of Anhalt-Zerbst.  The territory belonging to this branch of the family had been divided in 1396, and after the acquisition of Bernburg Prince George I made a further partition of Zerbst (Zerbst and Dessau). Early in the 16th century, however, owing to the death or abdication of several princes, the family had become narrowed down to the two branches of Anhalt-Köthen and Anhalt-Dessau (issued both from Anhalt-Dessau in 1471).

Wolfgang of Anhalt, called the Confessor, who became prince of Anhalt-Köthen in 1508, was the second ruler in the world to introduce the Reformation to his country. He was a co-signer of the Augsburg Confession in 1530, and after the Battle of Mühlberg in 1547 was placed under Imperial ban and deprived of his lands by Emperor Charles V. After the peace of Passau in 1552 he bought back his principality, but as he was childless he surrendered it in 1562 to his kinsmen the princes of Anhalt-Dessau. Ernest I, Prince of Anhalt-Dessau (d. 1516) left three sons, John V, George III, and Joachim, who ruled their lands together for many years, and who favoured the Lutheran doctrine, which thus became dominant in Anhalt. About 1546 the three brothers divided their principality and founded the lines of Zerbst, Plötzkau and Dessau. This division, however, was only temporary, as the acquisition of Köthen, and a series of deaths among the ruling princes, enabled Joachim Ernest, a son of John V, to unite the whole of Anhalt under his rule in 1570.

The first united principality of Anhalt was short-lived, and in 1603 it was split up into the mini states of Anhalt-Dessau, Anhalt-Bernburg, Anhalt-Köthen, Anhalt-Zerbst and Anhalt-Plötzkau.

Joachim Ernest died in 1586, and his five sons ruled the land in common until 1603, when owing to the lack of primogeniture, Anhalt was again divided, and the lines of Dessau, Bernburg, Plötzkau, Zerbst and Köthen were re-founded.  The principality was ravaged during the Thirty Years' War, and in the earlier part of this struggle Christian I of Anhalt-Bernburg took an important part.  In 1635 an arrangement was made by the various princes of Anhalt, which gave a certain authority to the eldest member of the family, who was thus able to represent the principality as a whole.  This proceeding was probably due to the necessity of maintaining an appearance of unity in view of the disturbed state of European politics.

In 1665, the branch of Anhalt-Köthen became extinct, and according to a family compact this district was inherited by Lebrecht, Prince of Anhalt-Plötzkau, who surrendered Plötzkau to Bernburg, and took the title of prince of Anhalt-Köthen.  In the same year the princes of Anhalt decided that if any branch of the family became extinct its lands should be equally divided between the remaining branches.  This arrangement was carried out after the death of Frederick Augustus, Prince of Anhalt-Zerbst in 1793, and Zerbst was divided between the three remaining princes.  During these years the policy of the different princes was marked, perhaps intentionally, by considerable uniformity. Once or twice Calvinism was favoured by a prince, but in general the house was loyal to the doctrines of Martin Luther.  The growth of Prussia provided Anhalt with a formidable neighbour, and the long-delayed establishment of primogeniture by all branches of the family prevented further divisions of the principality.

Dukes of Anhalt 

In 1806, Napoleon elevated the remaining states of Anhalt-Bernburg, Anhalt-Dessau and Anhalt-Köthen to duchies; in the meantime, Anhalt-Plötzkau and Anhalt-Zerbst had ceased to exist. These duchies were united again in 1863, due to the extinction of the Köthen and Bernburg lines.  The new duchy consisted of two large portions, Eastern and Western Anhalt, separated by the interposition of a part of the Prussian Province of Saxony and of five exclaves surrounded by Prussian territory: Alsleben, Mühlingen, Dornburg, Gödnitz and Tilkerode-Abberode. The eastern and larger portion of the duchy was enclosed by the Prussian government district of Potsdam (in the Prussian province of Brandenburg) and by Magdeburg and Merseburg, belonging to the Prussian province of Saxony. The western or smaller portion, the so-called Upper Duchy or Ballenstedt, was also enclosed by the two latter districts as well as by the Duchy of Brunswick-Lüneburg.

When a united state, the capital of Anhalt was Dessau.

Along with the fall of all German monarchies, the Duchy of Anhalt came to an end in 1918–19 during the revolution that followed the end of World War I. It was replaced by the Free State of Anhalt within the Weimar Republic. After World War II, the Free State was united with the Prussian parts of Saxony to form Saxony-Anhalt. Subsequently, Saxony-Anhalt was dissolved in 1952, but re-established prior to the German reunification in 1990, since when it has been one of the sixteen (Bundes)länder (states) of Germany.

Constitution 
The duchy, by virtue of a fundamental law, proclaimed on September 17, 1859 and subsequently modified by various decrees, was a constitutional monarchy. The duke, who bore the title of "Highness", wielded the executive power while sharing the legislation with the estates.  The diet (Landtag) was composed of thirty-six members, of whom two were appointed by the duke, eight were representatives of landowners paying the highest taxes, two of the highest assessed members of the commercial and manufacturing classes, fourteen of the other electors of the towns and ten of the rural districts.  The representatives were chosen for six years by indirect vote and must have completed their twenty-fifth year.  The duke governed through a minister of state, who was the praeses of all the departments — finance, home affairs, education, public worship and statistics.

Population 
In 1905 the population of the Duchy of Anhalt was 328,007, a ratio of about 351 to the square mile (909 km²). The country was divided into the districts of Dessau, Köthen, Zerbst, Bernburg and Ballenstedt, of which that of Bernburg was the most, and that of Ballenstedt the least, populated. Of the towns, four, viz. Dessau, Bernburg, Köthen and Zerbst, had populations exceeding 20,000.

The inhabitants of the duchy, with the exception of about 12,000 Roman Catholics and 1700 Jews, were members of the Evangelical State Church of Anhalt. The supreme ecclesiastical authority was the consistory in Dessau; while a synod of 39 members, elected for six years, assembled at periods to deliberate on internal matters touching the organization of the church. The Roman Catholics were under the bishop of Paderborn.

Rulers of Anhalt

House of Ascania

Partitions of Anhalt under Ascanian rule

Table of rulers

Heads of the House of Anhalt since 1918 
 Duke Joachim Ernst 1918–1947
 Prince Friedrich 1947–1963
 Prince Eduard 1963–present

Notes

References 

States and territories established in 1212
Lists of princes
Former states and territories of Saxony-Anhalt
History of Anhalt
1210s establishments in the Holy Roman Empire
1218 establishments in Europe
1806 disestablishments in the Holy Roman Empire